Party Hats is a jazz studio album by Will Bernard recorded in 2006 and released in 2007. Party Hats received a Grammy Award nomination for Best Contemporary Jazz Album of 2007. The album gave Bernard more visibility as a jazz guitarist.

Track listing
 "Share the Sea" - 5:38
 "White Elephant Sale" - 4:16
 "Ripple Sole" - 6:37
 "Leo's Cat" - 6:19
 "Party Hats" - 5:05
 "Afro Sheen" - 6:55
 "Chin Up" - 4:57
 "Newbie" - 4:16
 "Folding Green" - 4:57
 "Rattle Trap" - 4:48
 "Penske" - 4:42

Personnel
Will Bernard - guitar
Wil Blades - Hammond B3
Keith McArthur - bass (1,7)
Ryan Newman - bass (2-6, 8-11)
Jan Jackson - drums (1, 2, 4, 5, 7, 11)
Paul Spina - drums (3, 6, 8-10)
Cochemea Gastelum - alto saxophone (1)
Joe Cohen - tenor saxophone (1, 2, 5, 6, 7)
Peter Apfelbaum - tenor saxophone, qarqabas, melodica (3, 6, 7)
Dave Ellis - tenor saxophone (9, 10)
Mike Olmos - trumpet (1, 6, 7)
Adam Theis - trombone (1, 6, 7)
Josh Jones - percussion (1, 4-7)
Michael Bluestein - Hammond B3, electric piano (3, 7)

References

2007 albums
Will Bernard albums